Kathy Osterman (July 22, 1943 – December 8, 1992), was a Chicago politician who was born Kathleen Mary Lonergan in the Bronx.  Entering politics as a block club president who had been social director of Lawrence House, a facility for disabled persons, Osterman in 1981 became a community relations director for then-State's Attorney Richard M. Daley, who became her political patron.

In 1987 Osterman emerged victorious from an eleven-person race in which Mayor Harold Washington declined to endorse any candidate, and was elected alderman of the lakefront 48th Ward, which at that time consisted primarily of the Edgewater community as well as parts of Uptown. The 48th ward is now represented by Osterman's son, Harry Osterman.  Initially a part of the Washington bloc in Council Wars, she switched to the largely white bloc immediately following Washington's death and during the tenure of Eugene Sawyer.  She served on numerous City Council committees, including the Human Rights Committee, where she forged strong links with the ward's significant gay community.  Only two years into her term, Osterman retired in 1989, facilitating Daley's appointment of Mary Ann Smith as alderman.  Osterman subsequently was appointed Director of the Mayor's Office of Special Events.

During her brief tenure, Osterman worked on the rehabilitation of the Broadway Armory and the restoration of two vintage mansions in Berger Park along Sheridan Road, as public facilities. She lobbied vigorously for passage of Chicago's Human Rights Ordinance in 1988. As a result, Osterman  was inducted into the Chicago Gay and Lesbian Hall of Fame as a Friend of the Community in 1993.

On May 1, 1992, Osterman married radio political commentator Bruce DuMont.  Later that year she died of cancer.

On July 22, 1993 Ardmore Beach in the Edgewater neighborhood was renamed Kathy Osterman Beach. In addition to the renamed signage on the beach pavilion, a memorial plaque was erected.

References

Categories 

Chicago City Council members
1943 births
1992 deaths
Women city councillors in Illinois
20th-century American politicians
20th-century American women politicians
Inductees of the Chicago LGBT Hall of Fame